Ringsted Municipality is a municipality (Danish, kommune) in Region Sjælland on the island of Zealand (Sjælland) in east Denmark.  The municipality covers an area of 295 km2, and has a total population of 35,141 (2022).  Its mayor is Henrik Hvidesten, a member of Venstre.

The main town and the site of its municipal council is the city of Ringsted.

Ringsted municipality was not merged with other municipalities on 1 January 2007, during the nationwide Kommunalreformen ("The Municipal Reform" of 2007).

Urban areas
The ten largest urban areas in the municipality are:

Others include Ortved.

Politics

Municipal council
Ringsted's municipal council consists of 21 members, elected every four years.

Below are the municipal councils elected since the Municipal Reform of 2007.

Attractions
 St. Bendt's Church (Skt. Bendts Kirke) is located in the middle of the town. The church contains several royal tombs.
 Skjoldenæsholm Tram Museum

Notable people 
 Nicolai Eigtved (1701 in Egtved, Haraldsted – 1754) a Danish architect; proponent of the French rococo
 Hemming Hansen (1884 in Kværkeby – 1964) a Danish boxer who competed in the 1908 Summer Olympics
 Ricardt Madsen (1905 in Kværkeby – 1993) a Danish boxer who competed in the 1928 Summer Olympics
 Michael Brockenhuus-Schack (born 1960) a Danish count, landowner, chamberlain and board member; owns Giesegaard and Juellund at Ringsted.

Image gallery

References 

 Municipal statistics: NetBorger Kommunefakta, delivered from KMD aka Kommunedata (Municipal Data)
 Municipal mergers and neighbors: Eniro new municipalities map

External links 

 
 The Tram Museum Skjoldenæsholm

 
Municipalities of Region Zealand
Municipalities of Denmark